Walukagga Shafik (born 10 January 1996), is a Ugandan rapper better known by his stage name Fik Fameica a.k.a. Fresh Bwoy. He makes music in genres like rap, hiphop, afrobeat and afropop .His musical debut came in 2015 with "Pistol" under the Black Man Town music label, led by a Ugandan music icon Geosteady. His later songs, "Salawo" and "Mbega Wa Bbaala" gained him a recording contract with Kama Ivien Management. His club hit "Batuwulira" followed by "Byenyenya" followed made him the most booked Ugandan artist in 2017. Fik  won awards in Uganda and East Africa and went on to win Uganda's most popular artist in 2017. In 2018, he was crowned Breakthrough Artist, Best in Hip-Hop and Best Rap Song for his track "Kutama" at the annual HiPipo Awards.

He continued with club hits, including "Mafia", "Property", "Sconto" and "Tonsukuma". In 2019, he paired up with Nigerian superstar Patoranking for hit song "Omu Bwati"'. started a recording label called Fresh Gang Records in 2019 where they signed various artists like Mozelo Kidz, local managers like Big Sam and official dancers like Wembley Mo, & DJ Ranks Showmaster. Under this group he has released his later songs "Muko", "Tevunya" (featuring Sheebah), (Stupid) "Ndi Byange"(Buligita) and so on.

Discography 
{| class="wikitable"
|+songs
!song Title
!Year
|-
|Pistol
|2015
|-
|Kutama
|2017
|-
|Byenyenya
|2017
|-
|Kachima
|2017
|-
|Sitani Tonkema Ft. Sheebah Karungi
|2017
|-
|Sconto
|2018
|-
|My property
|2018
|-
|Tonsukuma
|2018
|-
|Tubikole Ft. Vinka
|2018
|-
|Mwaga Ft. Rayvanny
|2018
|-
|Am Different
|2019
|-
|Wansakata
|2019
|-
|Tell me
|2019
|-
|Muko
|2020

Recognition 
Fameica received his first international nomination with Khaligraph Jones Sarkodie in the 2018 Nigeria Entertainment Awards in the category of Best Male Artist Non-Nigerian/Africa.

ZINNA Awards 2018 

|-
|2018
|Fameica
|Artist of the Year
|
|-
|2018
|Fameica
|Breakthrough Artist of the Year
|
|-

Buzz Teeniez Awards 2018

|-
|2018
|Fameica
|Teeniez Male Artist of the Year
|
|-
|2018
|Fameica
|Top Hood Rapper
|
|-

HiPipo Music Awards 2018

|-
|2018
|Fameica
|Breakthrough Artist of the Year
|
|-
|2018
|Kutama
|Best Hip Hop/Rap Song 
|
|-
|2018
|Sitani Tonkema
|Best AfroBeat Song 

2021
Best LugaFlow/Rap Song • Buligita – Fik Fameica (Winner)

Best LugaFlow/Rap Artist • Fik Fameica (Winner

2022 
Best Fans Team. Winner 

Best LugaFlow/Rap Song. Winner

|-

References

1996 births
Living people
Ugandan rappers